Beta-parvin is a protein that in humans is encoded by the PARVB gene.

Members of the parvin family, including PARVB, PARVA and PARVG, are actin-binding proteins associated with focal contacts.[supplied by OMIM]

References

Further reading